Go for Your Life is the fifth studio album by American hard rock band Mountain, released on March 9, 1985. It was their first studio album since 1974's Avalanche.

It was the first Mountain album to not feature production or performance from Felix Pappalardi, who had been shot and killed by his wife Gail Collins in 1983. The album's closing track, "Little Bit of Insanity", was dedicated to Pappalardi's memory, and the album cover artwork was also designed with the fallen bassist/producer in mind. "What we wanted to do was give the feeling of someone looking up from their grave. And you can tell that's exactly what's going on with the image we used," said Leslie West in 2013.

The album features bassist Mark Clarke, who had been a member of Uriah Heep and Colosseum, and was produced by Pete Solley, who had worked with a diverse range of artists including The Rolling Stones, Oingo Boingo and The Allman Brothers Band. It charted at #166 in the US charts when released in March 1985.

Track listing
All tracks composed by Leslie West and Corky Laing, except "Hard Times" co-written with Bud Prager.

Side one
 "Hard Times" – 4:24
 "Spark" – 3:43
 "She Loves Her Rock (And She Loves It Hard)" – 3:43
 "Bardot Damage" – 4:03

Side two
 "Shimmy on the Footlights" – 4:22
 "I Love Young Girls" – 3:11
 "Makin' It in Your Car" – 3:07
 "Babe in the Woods" – 4:40
 "Little Bit of Insanity" – 2:30

Personnel
 Leslie West – guitar, vocals
 Mark Clarke – bass
 Corky Laing – drums

with:
 Ian Hunter – sequencing on "Hard Times"
 Eric Johnson – synthesizer on "Spark"
 Miller Anderson – slide guitar on "Makin' It in Your Car"
 Chuck Kirkpatrick – background vocals

Additional personnel
 Bud Prager - recording director
 Pete Solley - engineer (Criteria)
 Jim Sessody - assistant engineer (Criteria)
 Mike Scott - engineer (Wizard)
 Gary Lyons - engineer (Wizard)
 Doug MacDonald - assistant engineer (Wizard)
 Mike Fuller - mastering
 Lane/Donald - art direction
 Barry Jackson - illustration

Charts

References

External links 
 Mountain - Go for Your Life (1985) album at AllMusic.com
 Mountain - Go for Your Life (1985) album releases & credits at Discogs.com
 Mountain - Go for Your Life (1985) album to be listened as stream at Play.Spotify.com

1985 albums
Mountain (band) albums